Ultimate 500 is a 5-shot single-action revolver chambered for the .500 S&W cartridge, manufactured by Gary Reeder Custom Guns.

The revolver has an 8.5-inch barrel.

Revolvers of the United States
.50 caliber handguns
Single-action revolvers

References